The Highlights routine competition of the 2020 European Aquatics Championships was held on 15 May 2021.

It was the first time the highlights routine was contested at a LEN European Aquatics Championships.

Results
The final was held at 09:00.

References

Highlights routine